TSW Pegasus FC is an association football club founded in 2008. The club has had eight managers, in twelve tenures. The club was known as TSW Pegasus FC from 2008 to 2012, as Sun Pegasus FC from 2012 to 2015, as Hong Kong Pegasus FC from 2015 to 2020, and reverted to TSW Pegasus FC in 2020.

Managers
Only league matches are counted.

Notes
A ^ The winning percentage listed is rounded to two decimal places.

References

managers